Sneathiella chungangensis is a Gram-negative, strictly  aerobic, non-spore-forming and motile bacterium from the genus of Sneathiella which has been isolated from marine sand.

References

External links
Type strain of Sneathiella chungangensis at BacDive -  the Bacterial Diversity Metadatabase

Alphaproteobacteria
Bacteria described in 2014